Clinidae is a family of marine fish in the order Blenniiformes within the series Ovalentaria, part of the Percomorpha . Temperate blennies, the family ranges from the Atlantic, Pacific, and Indian Oceans, in both the Southern and Northern Hemispheres. The family contains about 86 species in 20 genera, the 60-cm-long giant kelpfish (Heterostichus rostratus) being the largest; most are far smaller.

With small cycloid scales, clinoid blennies may have a deep or slender build; some members of the family bear the name "snake blenny" and "eel blenny" for this reason. Dorsal spines outnumber soft rays;  two spines are in the anal fin. Like many other blennies, clinids possess whisker-like structures on their heads called cirri.

The majority of species possesses rich, highly variable colouration in shades of reddish-brown to olive, often with cryptic patterns; this suits the lifestyle of clinid blennies, which frequent areas of dense weed or kelp. Generally staying within intertidal zones to depths around 40 m, some species are also found in tide pools. Eggs are deposited on kelp for the male to guard. Clinids feed primarily on small crustaceans and mollusks.

The name Clinidae derives from the Greek klinein meaning "sloping", a reference to the shape of the sphenoid bone.

Genera
These genera are classified in the family Clinidae:

Blennioclinus Gill, 1860
Blennophis Swainson, 1839
Cancelloxus J.L.B. SmithSmith, 1961
Cirrhibarbis Valenciennes, 1836
Climacoporus Barnard, 1935
Clinitrachus Swainson, 1839
Clinoporus Barnard, 1927
Clinus Cuvier, 1816
Cologrammus Gill, 1893
Cristiceps Valenciennes, 1836
Ericentrus Gill, 1893
Fucomimus Smith, 1946
Gibbonsia Cooper, 1864
Heteroclinus Castelnau, 1872
Heterostichus Girard, 1854
Muraenoclinus Smith, 1946
Myxodes Cuvier, 1829
Ophiclinops Whitley, 1932
Ophiclinus Castelnau, 1872
Pavoclinus Smith, 1946
Peronedys Steindachner, 1883
Ribeiroclinus S. Y. Pinto, 1965
Smithichthys Hubbs, 1952
Springeratus S. C. Shen, 1971
Sticharium Günther, 1867
Xenopoclinus Smith, 1948

Timeline

See also

 List of fish common names
 List of fish families

External links

 
Blenniiformes
Extant Miocene first appearances